Aqua-Aston Hospitality, LLC is a Honolulu-based hotel management company operating a multi-branded line of hotels, condominiums and vacation resort properties primarily located in Hawaii. The chain was purchased by Marriott Vacations Worldwide in 2018.

History

Aston Hotels and Resorts 
Aston Hotels and Resorts served as predecessor to Aqua-Aston Hospitality. Aston was founded in 1967, as the Hotel Corporation of the Pacific (HCP) as a hotel and condominium management firm; the Hotel Corporation of the Pacific is itself traced to 1948 with the opening of the Royal Grove Hotel in Waikiki. In 1986, the Hotel Corporation of the Pacific was then renamed as Aston Hotels and Resorts. In 2007, Miami-based timeshare company, Interval Leisure Group (ILG, Inc.) acquired Aston Hotels and Resorts for $70 million.

Aqua Hotels and Resorts 
Separately, Aqua Hotels & Resorts was launched in 2001 by Hawaii hotelier Michael Paulin. The company was founded as a hotel and condominium management firm, later representing 22 properties in Hawaii. In 2013, Interval Leisure Group acquired Aqua Hotels and Resorts for an undisclosed sum.

Aqua-Aston Merger and Marriott Vacations Takeover 
After their individual acquisitions by Interval Leisure Group in 2007 and 2013, both companies remained mutually exclusive subsidiaries of Internal Leisure Group. In 2015, Interval announced the merger of Aston Hotels and Resorts and Aqua Hotels and Resorts. As a result of the merger, the companies were rebranded into its present name, Aqua-Aston Hospitality, LLC. On 30 April 2018, Orlando-based timeshare firm, Marriott Vacations Worldwide Corporation announced its acquisition of Aqua-Aston's parent, Internal Leisure Group in a cash and stock deal worth $4.7 Billion. The deal was completed in the September of the same year, marking Marriott Vacation's successful takeover of ILG, Inc. and its subsidiaries and brands, including Aqua-Aston Hospitality.

Labour Disputes 
In 2016, Aqua-Aston faced a dispute over unfair labour practice charges filed by Hawaii's hospitality and healthcare worker's union, Unite Here 5; 22 charges were filed against Aqua-Aston after employees at Aston Waikiki fought on a year-long dispute with management for rights to unionise. On 1 June 2016, the company was found guilty of federal law violations relating to unfair labour practices at an administrative law court. In 2017, a similar dispute occurred with the workers of Aqua-Aston's Ilikai Hotel in Waikiki, when a contract dispute over wages and workload resulted in a one-day worker strike involving 63 employees.

List of Hotels
There are a total of 31 hotel properties being managed across 4 Hawaiian islands and Costa Rica. There are fifteen on Oahu located in Waikiki, as well as seven on Maui, two on Kauai, and two on the Big Island.

Oahu

 Aqua Aloha Surf Waikiki
 Aqua Oasis
 Aqua Palms Waikiki
 Aqua Skyline at Island Colony
 Aston at the Executive Centre Hotel
 Aston at the Waikiki Banyan
 Aston Waikiki Beach Hotel
 Aston Waikiki Beach Tower
 Aston Waikiki Circle Hotel
 Aston Waikiki Sunset
 ESPACIO The Jewel of Waikiki
 Ewa Hotel Waikiki
 Ilikai Hotel & Luxury Suites
 Ilikai Lite
 Luana Waikiki Hotel and Suites

Maui

 Aston at Papakea Resort
 Aston at the Maui Banyan
 Aston at The Whaler on Kaanapali Beach
 Aston Kaanapali Shores
 Aston Mahana at Kaanapali
 Aston Maui Hill
 Maui Kaanapali Villas

Kauai
 Aston at Poipu Kai
 Aston Islander on the Beach

Hawaii Island
 Aston Kona by the Sea
 Shores at Waikoloa

Orlando
 The Fountains at ChampionsGate
 Tuscana Resort Orlando by Aston

Costa Rica
 Crocodile Bay Resort

References

External links

Hotel chains in the United States
Companies based in Hawaii
2001 establishments in Hawaii
Hotels established in 2001